Boston Neighborhood Network (BNN) is a public, educational, and government access (PEG) broadcasting service serving Boston, Massachusetts.

BNN's programming is broadcast on two channels:
 News & Information, Comcast channel 9 and RCN Cable channel 15
 Community Access, Comcast channel 23 and RCN channel 83

BNN members have access to two television studios, digital field production and editing equipment, a multimedia lab, and a mobile production truck, as well as hands-on media training classes. BNN also operates WBCA-LP radio.

See also 
 List of television stations in Massachusetts
 List of wired multiple-system broadband providers in Massachusetts (by municipality)

External links 

BNN on Instagram

1983 establishments in Massachusetts
Organizations established in 1983
Community-building organizations
English-language television stations in the United States
Organizations based in Boston
Television channels and stations established in 1983
American public access television
Non-profit organizations based in Boston
Television stations in Massachusetts